Lagodon is a genus of saltwater fish in the family Sparidae, the breams and porgies. It is monotypic, being represented by the single species Lagodon rhomboides, commonly known as pinfish. Other common names include pin perch, sand perch, choffer, and butterfish. It inhabits mostly subtropical shallow coastal waters of the Atlantic and Gulf coasts of the United States and Mexico.

Description
Both the male and the female have a silvery sheen with five to six vertical bars on the side. They have olive backs with yellow and white pigmentation and blue, green, and purple iridescence. The anterior dorsal fin has 12 rigid, spiny rays capable of superficially puncturing human skin, giving the species its common name, pinfish.

Range
The pinfish is found in Bermuda and along the United States coast from Massachusetts to Texas, and down along the Mexican Gulf Coast. It is also found along the northern Yucatán coast and near some northern Caribbean islands, but it is less common in the tropical portions of its range.

Habitat
The adult pinfish prefers waters between 30 and 50 feet deep, while the juvenile is more common where there is some cover, such as seagrass beds, rocky bottoms, jetties, pilings, and mangroves. It prefers higher-salinity water. It rarely schools, but it associates with other individuals, especially where food items such as barnacles are abundant.

Diet
Pinfish undergo ontogenetic changes in the morphology of their dentition and gut tracts which affect diet throughout their life history. Juvenile pinfish are carnivorous and primarily eat shrimp, fish eggs, insect larvae, polychaete worms, and amphipods.  As pinfish become older and larger they become increasingly more herbivorous, with plant matter comprising >90% of the diet for pinfish greater than 100mm.

Predators
The pinfish is prey for alligator gar, longnose gar, ladyfish, spotted sea trout, red drum, southern flounder, pelicans, grouper, cobia, snook and bottlenose dolphins.

Reproduction
Sexual maturity is reached at about one year, when the fish is 80 to 100 mm in length. Spawning season is in the fall and winter. Eggs are broadcast in the water by the female, then fertilized by the male. The number of eggs varies from 7,000 to 90,000. They hatch after about 48 hours. Larvae are not protected by adults. The larval stage ends when the fish is about 12 mm in length, and the juvenile reaches maturity when it is about 80 mm. Because this species is eaten by many other animals, its life span is generally short.

Commercial and recreational significance
The pinfish are not generally sought as sport or food in the United States due to its small size and numerous small bones. It is used as live bait by anglers targeting tarpon, red drum, spotted sea trout, and flounder. It is generally considered a nuisance bait-stealer. The famous naturalist, Edward O. Wilson, lost the vision in his right eye at the age of seven, when he caught a pinfish and it flew up and struck him in the face.

References 

Sparidae
Monotypic fish genera
Fish of the Atlantic Ocean
Taxa named by John Edwards Holbrook